Demetrios G. Papademetriou (February 18, 1946 – January 26, 2022) was an American immigration scholar and advisor. He cofounded the Migration Policy Institute in 2001.

References 

1946 births
2022 deaths
American academics
Duke University faculty
Greek emigrants to the United States
University System of Maryland faculty